Hotel Attraction was a proposal by architect Antoni Gaudí for a skyscraper in Lower Manhattan, New York City.

History
Little is known about its origin, and the project remained unknown until 1956, when a report by Joan Matamala i Flotats was published, called "When the New World called Gaudí".

The drawings for the Attraction Hotel were proposed as a basis for the rebuilding of Ground Zero in Manhattan. A modified version of the drawings by Paul Laffoley earned broad media attention. The architect planned to feature a memorial at its base and the Sphere for Plaza Fountain as center of an observation platform at the top of the hotel.

The hotel was featured in the Fox Broadcasting television show Fringe. It was featured in the New York City skyline in the alternate universe.

References

External links
 http://www.gaudi2002.bcn.es/english/noticia/noti89.htm 
 Emporis.com

Unbuilt buildings and structures in New York City
Antoni Gaudí buildings
Hotels in Manhattan
Proposed skyscrapers in the United States
Lower Manhattan